Bobby Craig Thomas  (born 30 January 2001) is a English professional footballer who plays as a defender for Barnsley on loan from EFL Championship club Burnley.

Career
In March 2019, Thomas signed his first professional deal with Burnley, signing a two-year contract. In November 2018, he went out on months youth loan to Northern Premier League side Kendal Town. He was named as the club's young player of the year at the end of the 2018–19 season. On 23 September 2020, Thomas made his senior debut for Burnley, playing the full match in a 2–0 win over Millwall in the EFL Cup.
On 22 January 2021, Thomas joined League Two side Barrow on loan for the remainder of the 2020-21 season.

On 1 September 2022, Thomas signed for EFL League One club Bristol Rovers on a season-long loan deal. Thomas made his debut a couple of days later, playing the duration of a 2–2 home draw with Morecambe, scoring Rovers' second equaliser ten minutes from time.

On 14 January 2023, Thomas joined EFL League One side Barnsley on loan for the remainder of the 2022-23 season.

Career statistics

References

2001 births
Living people
English footballers
Association football defenders
Burnley F.C. players
Kendal Town F.C. players
Barrow A.F.C. players
Bristol Rovers F.C. players
Barnsley F.C. players
Northern Premier League players
English Football League players